The Array Network Facility component of the EarthScope USArray project is charged with ensuring all the real time seismic data collected from the Transportable Array and Flexible Arrays are transmitted, checked for quality, archived, and accessible online for researchers and the general public. The facility is part of the Scripps Institution of Oceanography at the University of California San Diego. The principal investigator of the ANF is Dr. Frank Vernon.

The facility has developed a series of online tools to allow researchers and the general public to interact with data collected from over four hundred broadband seismic stations across the United States. These four hundred stations make up the Transportable Array component of the EarthScope USArray project. Analysts review automated event detections and produce event bulletins including seismic phase picks which are distributed through the IRIS DMC.

The ANF component of the USArray experiment is funded by the National Science Foundation.

External links
 ANF website
 Real-time view of the deployed stations in the USArray
 Status of the dataloggers located at each station in the USArray Transportable Array (TA)
 Scripps Institution of Oceanography 
 EarthScope website
 UCSD website

Sources
 USArray Array Network Facility (ANF): Metadata, Network and Data Monitoring, and Quality Assurance During the First Year of Operations (2004)
 The Earthscope USArray Array Network Facility (ANF): Metadata, Network and Data Monitoring, Quality Assurance During the Second Year of Operations (2005)
 The EarthScope USArray Array Network Facility (ANF): Metadata, Network and Data Monitoring, Quality Assurance During the Third Year of Operations (2006)
 Real-time operation of the NSF EarthScope USArray Transportable Array (2007)
 The Earthscope USArray Array Network Facility (ANF): Metadata, Network and Data Monitoring, Quality Assurance as We Start to Roll (2008)
 Data Latency Characteristics Observed Through Diverse Communication Links by the EarthScope USArray Transportable Array (2008)
 The EarthScope Array Network Facility: application-driven low-latency web-based tools for accessing high-resolution multi-channel waveform data (2008)

Seismological observatories, organisations and projects